Mian is an Ok language spoken in the Telefomin district of the Sandaun province in Papua New Guinea by the Mian people. It has some 3,500 speakers spread across two dialects: West Mian (a.k.a. Suganga), with approximately 1,000 speakers in around Yapsiei, and East Mian, with approximately 2,500 speakers in and around Timeilmin, Temsakmin, Sokamin, Gubil, Fiak and Hotmin.

Phonology 
Phonologically, Mian is very similar to other Papuan languages in the size of its phoneme inventory, but it nevertheless has some peculiarities, such as its contrast between a plain [a] and a pharyngealized [aˤ]. It is also a tonal language.

Vowels 
Mian has six vowels, including the pharyngealized open front vowel.

Mian also has four diphthongs:

/ɛ/ is realized as [ə] in word-initial low-tone syllables, [ɛ] elsewhere.

/a/ is realized as [ɐ] in unaccented syllables, [ə] in word-initial low-tone syllables beginning with a consonant, [a] elsewhere.

/o/ is realized as [ɔ] in word-initial low-tone syllables and in syllables ending in a voiceless plosive or [ŋ], [o] elsewhere.

/u/ is realized as [ʊ] in word-initial low-tone syllables, [u] elsewhere.

Consonants 
Mian has 16 consonants:

 is realized as  word-initially,  or [p̚] syllable-finally, [b] elsewhere.
 Examples: banǒn [ᵐbànǒn] lower arm, mǎab [mǎˤːp̚] frog, teběl [tʰɛ̀bɛ̌l] ant

/t/ is realized as [tʰ] before vowels, [tʰ] or [t̚] syllable-finally.
 Examples: tam [tʰàm] temple, mát [mát̚] gall bladder

/k/ is realized as [kʰ] before vowels, [kʰ] or [k̚] syllable-finally, sometimes [x] between vowels, [qʰ] before [aˤ].
 Examples: kemin [kʰèmìn] to do, manggěk [màŋgɛ̌k̚] bee, okok [òxòk̚] work, kaawá [qʰàˤwá] steel axe

/ɡ/ is realized as [ᵑɡ] word-initially, [ɡ] elsewhere.
 Examples: gát [ᵑɡát̚] mole, manggěk [màŋɡɛ̌k̚] bee

/ɡʷ/ is realized as [ᵑɡʷ] word-initially, [ɡʷ] elsewhere.
 Examples: gwaán [ᵑɡʷàán] spider, gwalgwal [ᵑɡʷàlɡʷàl] twins

Tones 
Mian has five tonemes:

The tones of Mian are very complex, as they are subject to various phonological processes, and furthermore, they can be used for indicating various grammatical aspects, especially in connection with verbs, where the tones are crucial for understanding.

Consider the two verb forms below, being non-hodiernal and imperfective respectively:
 dolâbībe [dòlábíbè] I wrote
 dolâbibe [dòlábìbè] I am writing

Nouns
Large objects in Mianmin are feminine, while small objects are masculine.

References

Further reading

Digital resources 
 

Languages of Sandaun Province
Languages of East Sepik Province
Ok languages
Tonal languages